Paul Höffer (21 December 1895 – 31 August 1949) was a German composer. He was born in Barmen and died in Berlin.

In 1936 he won a gold medal in the art competitions of the Olympic Games for his Olympischer Schwur (Olympic Vow).  His works also include a solo violin sonata (Op. 18, 1931).

References

External links
profile

1895 births
1949 deaths
German classical composers
20th-century classical composers
Academic staff of the Hochschule für Musik Hanns Eisler Berlin
Olympic gold medalists in art competitions
German male classical composers
20th-century German composers
Medalists at the 1936 Summer Olympics
20th-century German male musicians
Olympic competitors in art competitions